The 2012–13 DFB-Pokal was the 70th season of the annual German football cup competition. It began on 17 August 2012 with the first of six rounds and ended on 1 June 2013 with the final at the Olympiastadion in Berlin. The defending champions were Borussia Dortmund, but they were beaten by Bayern Munich in the quarter-finals. Bayern Munich went on to win the competition, defeating VfB Stuttgart 3–2 in the final, ultimately going on to conquer the continental treble. As runners-up, VfB Stuttgart have qualified for the third qualifying round of the 2013–14 UEFA Europa League, since Bayern Munich won the Bundesliga and thus gained the right to compete in the 2013–14 UEFA Champions League.

Participating clubs
The following 64 teams competed in the first round:

Schedule
The rounds of the 2012–13 competition are scheduled as follows:

Draw
The draws for the different rounds are conducted as following: For the first round, the participating teams will be split into two pots. The first pot contains all teams which have qualified through their regional cup competitions, the best four teams of the 3rd Liga and the bottom four teams of the Second Bundesliga. Every team from this pot will be drawn to a team from the second pot, which contains all remaining professional teams. The teams from the first pot will be set as the home team in the process.

The two-pot scenario will also be applied for the second round, with the remaining 3rd Liga/amateur teams in the first pot and the remaining professional teams in the other pot. Once one pot is empty, the remaining pairings will be drawn from the other pot with the first-drawn team for a match serving as hosts. For the remaining rounds, the draw will be conducted from just one pot. Any remaining 3rd Liga/amateur team will be the home team if drawn against a professional team. In every other case, the first-drawn team will serve as hosts.

Matches

First round
The draw took place on 23 June 2012.

Second round
The draw took place on 25 August 2012.

Round of 16
The draw for this round took place on 4 November 2012, while the matches took place on 18–19 December 2012.

Quarter-finals
The draw for this round took place on 19 December 2012. The matches were played on 26–27 February 2013.

All times are UTC+1

Semi-finals
The draw for this round took place on 3 March 2013. The matches were played on 16–17 April 2013.

Final

Bracket

References

External links
DFB-Pokal on kicker.de

2012-13
2012–13 in German football cups